Dean W. Kelley (July 12, 1876 – November 28, 1952) was an American attorney and president of the State Bar of Michigan. He was also the head football coach of the Michigan State Normal School (now known as Eastern Michigan University) for the 1892 season, compiling a record of 2–1.

Kelley studied law in St. Johns, Michigan, and later enrolled at Michigan State Normal School from which he graduated in 1899. He next attended the University of Michigan Law School. He began his practice of law in St. Johns, holding positions as city attorney, probate judge, and county prosecutor. He also taught in St. Johns and served as president of the board of education. He later lived in Lansing, Michigan, for 34 years. He was the president of the State Bar of Michigan in 1943. He was also president of the Wolverine Insurance Company for a time.

Head coaching record

References

1876 births
1962 deaths
Eastern Michigan Eagles football coaches
Michigan lawyers
University of Michigan Law School alumni
People from Evart, Michigan
People from St. Johns, Michigan
Coaches of American football from Michigan